Alpín II may refer to:

 Alpin II of Dalriada (ruled in the late 730s)
 Alpín II of the Picts (ruled 775–780)